Anchomenidius is a genus of ground beetles in the family Carabidae. There are at least two described species in Anchomenidius, found in Spain.

Species
These two species belong to the genus Anchomenidius:
 Anchomenidius astur (Sharp, 1873)
 Anchomenidius feldmanni Wrase & Assmann, 2001

References

Platyninae